Turbopsebius sulphuripes is a species of small-headed fly in the family Acroceridae.

References

Acroceridae
Articles created by Qbugbot
Insects described in 1869